The Catskill Aqueduct, part of the New York City water supply system, brings water from the Catskill Mountains to Yonkers where it connects to other parts of the system.

History
Construction commenced in 1907. The aqueduct proper was completed in 1916 and the entire Catskill Aqueduct system including three dams and 67 shafts was completed in 1924. The total cost of the aqueduct system was $177 million.

Specifications

The aqueduct normally operates well below capacity with daily averages around 350– of water per day. About 40% of New York City's water supply flows through the Catskill Aqueduct.

Geography
The Catskill Aqueduct begins at the Ashokan Reservoir in Olivebridge, New York, located in Ulster County. From the Ashokan Reservoir, the aqueduct traverses in a southeasterly direction through Ulster, Orange, and Putnam counties. It tunnels first beneath the Rondout Valley and Rondout Creek in the town of Marbletown, then beneath the Wallkill River in the town of Gardiner in Ulster County before flowing toward Orange County, New York. The aqueduct transports water from Ashokan as well as the Schoharie Reservoir, which feeds into Ashokan.

The aqueduct then enters Westchester County, New York, and flows to the Kensico Reservoir, which also receives water from the City's Delaware Aqueduct. It continues from the Kensico reservoir and terminates at the Hillview Reservoir in Yonkers. The Hillview Reservoir then feeds City Tunnels 1 and 2, which bring water to New York City. If necessary, water can be made to bypass both reservoirs.

References

See also 
Delaware Aqueduct
New York City Water Supply System

Water infrastructure of New York City
Landmarks in New York (state)
Aqueducts in New York (state)
Interbasin transfer